Catherine Maunoury is a French aerobatic pilot.

She won the World Aerobatic Championships in 1988 and 2000 in the female category. Only Svetlana Kapanina won this title more often.

In 2005 she was awarded the Centenary Medal by the Fédération Aéronautique Internationale.

References

External links
 Website of Catherine Maunoury (in French)

Year of birth missing (living people)
Living people
French aviators
Aerobatic pilots
French women aviators